Tom McIntosh is an Australian politician who has been a Labor member of the Victorian Legislative Council, having represented the Eastern Victoria Region since August 2022. He was appointed by a joint sitting of the Victorian Parliament on 17 August 2022 to fill a vacancy brought about by the death of Jane Garrett.

Prior to entering politics, McIntosh has worked as an electrician and staffer to federal Labor MP Ged Kearney.

References

|-

Year of birth missing (living people)
Living people
Members of the Victorian Legislative Council
Australian Labor Party members of the Parliament of Victoria
21st-century Australian politicians